Berit Brørby (born 5 December 1950) is a Norwegian politician for the Labour Party. She was President of the Nordic Council in 1998.

She was elected to the Norwegian Parliament from Oppland in 1985, and has been re-elected on five occasions. Brørby was President of the Odelsting 2005–2009.

Brørby was born in Oslo. At a local level, she was a member of Jevnaker municipality council from 1979 to 1983, and of Oppland county council from 1979 to 1987.

References

1950 births
Living people
Members of the Storting
Oppland politicians
Labour Party (Norway) politicians
Women members of the Storting
21st-century Norwegian politicians
21st-century Norwegian women politicians
20th-century Norwegian politicians
20th-century Norwegian women politicians